The Temple Boll Weevils were a minor league baseball team which played their home games at Woodson Field in Temple, Texas as a member of the Texas League from 1905 to 1907. Local newspapers took to calling them the "Cotton Bugs," a nickname coined by the Galveston Daily News.

History
The team finished with a record of 71-59 in its debut season in 1905, behind the Fort Worth Panthers by just a half game for second place in the league. After Temple got off to a slow start in the following season and Temple manager Con Lucid resigned, owner J.E. Edens sold the team to the Temple Baseball Association, a local stock company headed by Temple mayor Fred P. Hamill, who replaced Lucid with manager Fred Moore. With the Texas League struggling financially, it decided in mid-season to drop the Boll Weevils. The Temple Baseball Association, having only recently spent $3,000 to buy the team, filed an unsuccessful lawsuit against the league. In 1907 the Texas League took on several teams from the South Texas League and resurrected another incarnation of the Boll Weevils with players being contributed by the other teams. Due in part to poor performance and lacking fan support, 1907 would be their final season.

References

Defunct Texas League teams
Defunct baseball teams in Texas
Temple, Texas
1905 establishments in Texas
1907 disestablishments in the United States
Baseball teams established in 1905
Baseball teams disestablished in 1907